Laurel O'Donnell is an American author of romance novels.

Biography
Laurel O'Donnell started her writing career with a Golden Heart Competition nomination from the Romance Writers of America for her first medieval romance novel The Angel and the Prince.  This book caught the attention of Kensington Books and they signed Laurel to a multi-book deal.  She has been nominated for several awards including the Romantic Times Reviewers' Choice Award.  Her third novel A Knight of Honor won the Holt Medallion award.

Awards
 2000 – Holt Medallion Winner for Best Medieval Romance for A Knight of Honor

Bibliography

Medieval Novels
The Angel and the Prince (1996)
The Lady and The Falconer (1998)
A Knight of Honor (1999)
Midnight Shadow (2000)
Champion of the Heart (2001)
Angel's Assassin (2012)

Medieval Novellas
The Bride and the Brute (1998) featured in Blushing Brides

Paranormal Romance Novels
Immortal Death (2011)

Urban Fantasy
Lost Souls: Resurrection (2011)
Lost Souls: Imperfection (2012)

References

External links
Official Website
 RT Book Reviews
 Goodreads Author Page
 Laurel O'Donnell interview on Kindle Author

American romantic fiction writers
Year of birth missing (living people)
Living people